Aleksandar Benko (16 February 1925 – 26 May 1991) was a Croatian footballer who played one game internationally for both the Yugoslavia and Croatia national teams.

CLub career
A striker, he began his career with NK Čakovec in 1943, and in 1947 moved to Dinamo Zagreb with whom he won the Yugoslav Federal League in 1948, 1954 and 1958. In 1958 he moved to Switzerland where he played for Grasshopper (1958–59), Lugano (1959–60), Wohlen (1961–63) and St. Gallen (1963–67). There he remained for the rest of his life. He is buried in Zagreb's Mirogoj cemetery.

International career
He played for the Croatian national team in a friendly against Indonesia in Zagreb in 1956 and served as the team's captain. He also played for the Yugoslavian national team in a 1949 match against France.

References

External links
 
Profile at Serbian federation

1925 births
1991 deaths
Sportspeople from Čakovec
Association football forwards
Yugoslav footballers
Yugoslavia international footballers
Croatian footballers
Croatia international footballers
GNK Dinamo Zagreb players
Grasshopper Club Zürich players
FC Lugano players
FC Wohlen players
FC St. Gallen players
Yugoslav First League players
Swiss Super League players
Swiss Challenge League players
Swiss Promotion League players
Croatian expatriate footballers
Expatriate footballers in Switzerland
Dual internationalists (football)
Burials at Mirogoj Cemetery